Jaywalking is the act of pedestrians walking in or crossing a roadway that has traffic, other than at a designated crossing point, or otherwise, in disregard of traffic rules. The term originated in the United States as a derivation of the phrase jay-drivers (the word jay meaning 'a greenhorn, or rube'), people who drove horse-drawn carriages and automobiles on the wrong side of the road, before taking its current meaning. Jaywalking was coined as the automobile arrived in the street in the context of the conflict between pedestrian and automobiles (also then known as horseless carriages), more specifically the nascent automobile industry.

Jaywalking laws vary widely by jurisdiction. In many countries such as the United Kingdom, the word is not generally used and, with the exception of certain high-speed roads, there are no laws limiting how pedestrians can use public highways. This has caused confusion among British people visiting countries with such laws, with the BBC reporting on a case where a man from the UK got arrested in the U.S. city of Atlanta for crossing the road.

Legal texts in other countries use different concepts, such as Rules applicable to pedestrians in the Vienna Convention on Road Traffic. One member of this convention, the United Kingdom, does not have jaywalking laws; its Highway Code relies on the pedestrians making their own judgment on whether it is safe to cross based on the Green Cross Code.

Origin of the term

While jaywalking is associated with pedestrians today, the earliest references to "jay" behavior in the street were about horse-drawn carriages and automobiles in 1905 Kansas: "jay drivers" who did not drive on the correct side of the street. The term swiftly expanded to pedestrians, and by 1909, The Chanute Daily Tribune warned "The jay walker needs attention as well as the jay driver, and is about as big a nuisance." No historical evidence supports an alternative folk etymology by which the word is traced to either the letter "J" (characterizing the route a jaywalker might follow), or "jake walk" (an early term related to a drunkard's walk).

The earliest citation in the Oxford English Dictionary follows in 1917. Automobile interests in the US took up the cause of labeling and scorning jaywalkers in the 1910s and early 1920s, by then the earlier term of "jay driver" was declining in use. The word was promoted by pro-automobile interests in the 1920s, according to historian and alternative transportation advocate Peter D. Norton. Today, in the US, the word is often used synonymously with its current legal definition, crossing the street illegally.

Originally in the US, the legal rule was that "all persons have an equal right in the highway, and that in exercising the right each shall take due care not to injure other users of the way".  In time, however, streets became the province of vehicular traffic, both practically and legally.

Causes

People jaywalk for various reasons, including convenience and sometimes even personal safety, generally to cross the street. Going to a crosswalk can require a long detour.

Although cultural norms about jaywalking vary by locality, the practice cannot simply be explained by corresponding differences in law. For example, cities like Copenhagen and New York City have similar restrictions on jaywalking at signalised crosswalks, but the practice is far more common in New York.

Pedestrians are often forced to walk outside crosswalks, when they are blocked by cars due to traffic congestion or drivers stopping too far forward. The common practice of car-centric traffic-signal synchronisation produces green waves for motorists but not necessarily for pedestrians, who may encounter little or no conflicting traffic at cross streets where signals instruct them to wait.

Pedestrians may dislike using crossing at intersections for other reasons, such as discomfort dealing with traffic from several directions (whereas a jaywalker at a location distant from an intersection only needs to observe at most two directions of traffic), or wanting to avoid the extra air emissions generated by vehicles stopping and starting (given that vehicular emissions are significantly less when vehicles are moving at steady speeds). In rural and suburban areas, people may jaywalk due to a lack of sidewalks. Some pedestrians are unwilling to observe lengthy wait times at signals. They are also more likely to make "informal crossings" at wide roads, or at locations where formal crosswalks are too distant to be practical for them to use.

Some crosswalk signals that require a pedestrian to push a button are unusable for orthodox Jews on the Shabbat.

Safety
Unsignalised marked crosswalks where drivers are more likely to yield to pedestrians are not necessarily safer than their unmarked counterparts, where pedestrians behave more cautiously, not expecting motorists to yield.

Many American newspapers publish stories that are critical of pedestrian road users' safety practices, while police departments often instigate education and enforcement campaigns to curb jaywalking. While nearly 60% of American pedestrian deaths occur outside of crosswalks, fewer than 20% occur in close proximity to a crosswalk.

Legal view by jurisdiction 
When used in the technical sense, jaywalking specifically refers to violation of pedestrian traffic regulations and laws and is therefore illegal. In many countries, such regulations do not exist and jaywalking is an unknown concept.

Africa

Zimbabwe 
In Zimbabwe, jaywalking is illegal, as per the traffic laws gazetted in 2013 by the Ministry of Transport and Infrastructure Development. Disregarding designated crossing points or passing through red traffic lights carry a punishment of up to six months in jail or a US$20 fine, as part of the new Highway Code. The code also deals with all road users; it used to emphasise rules for motorists and cyclists.

Asia 
In many Asian countries, the low level of traffic control means that jaywalking is often more of a necessity to a pedestrian and is rarely punished except in major commercial hubs such as Singapore. In many countries like India and Vietnam, the level of traffic and the lack of knowledge and obedience to traffic safety rules makes it common for pedestrians to walk out into oncoming traffic and effectively "carve out" a route to the other side of the road.

China 

In recent years, jaywalking has become more strictly controlled in China as car traffic increased. Police have tested facial recognition to identify jaywalkers. The authorities applied a new method to deter jaywalkers by displaying their photo on large public screens in the area where the jaywalking occurred, to publicly shame any violator of pedestrian street rules. The system has flaws: the photo of the businesswoman Dong Mingzhu was displayed on those screens after the AI systems misinterpreted her appearance on a passing bus advertisement as a real person crossing the street in an illegal fashion.

South Korea 
In Korea, it is illegal to cross the road outside of the crosswalk mark on a road with a crosswalk or to cross without following traffic lights on the crosswalk. On a crossing controlled by traffic light, pedestrians can cross only on green. Except for persons with physical disabilities, pedestrians must use the facilities to cross the roads with overpasses or underground sidewalks. Jaywalking is naturally prohibited on roads with pedestrian prohibition signs such as expressways.

The fine for jaywalking is 20,000 won.

However, pedestrians can cross a road which doesn't have any crosswalk. They also cross the intersection and near part of intersections without traffic lights at the shortest distance. The standard for not having a crosswalk is usually 200 meters. In addition, on roads that do not have a distinction between center lines or lanes, pedestrians can occupy the entire road, walk and cross. This is entirely legal and pedestrians are legally protected from cars.

Hong Kong 
In Hong Kong, it is an offence to cross roads within the zigzag area around zebra crossings, or within 15 m of other crossing points (including signal-controlled crossings, footbridges and subways) without using the crossing, or climb over fences to cross the road. It is also an offence to cross the road at a signalled crossing when it is red.

India 
In India, jaywalking is not explicitly included in the law as an offence but is covered under the broader term 'obstruction of traffic' in state and metropolitan laws. Examples include section 28B of the Delhi Police Act, 33B of the Bombay Police Act and 92G of the Karnataka Police Act. However, jaywalking is common in cities because of the lack of regulated crossings and footpaths, ignorance of safety rules, and the poor regulation of related laws by authorities. Drives against jaywalking are conducted by the police departments from time to time and offenders are given fines of 100 to 500 Indian rupees, depending upon the jurisdictions. Drivers must yield the right of way for pedestrians at unsignalled crossings and marked pedestrian crossings.

Iran 
In Iran, crossing outside crossing points within 150 of one or if the pedestrian light is red, as well as starting to cross when the light is flashing, has been prohibited since the 1970s. If in an intersection there is no pedestrian light, traffic lights would be considered and so it is illegal when it is red or orange. As of November, 2009, jaywalking carries fines from 300,000 up to 2,000,000 rials (US$9 to US$60). The law has almost never been enforced.

Kazakhstan
In Kazakhstan, jaywalking is illegal and punishable by a fine.  This is enforced on major streets in large cities.

Singapore

In Singapore, jaywalking is an offence. A fine of $50 is payable for the first offence. Repeat offenders can be charged $1000 and a jail term of 3 months, but the latter is rarely imposed. In 2011, 8,650 people were caught jaywalking and fined in Singapore. Between January and March 2012, Singapore prosecuted 1,758 for jaywalking, and between January and March 2013, 2,409 jaywalkers were fined.

Europe

In many European countries, pedestrians are banned from high speed roads such as motorways or expressways, but they are generally permitted on regular rural and urban roads. That is done in compliance with the Vienna Convention on Road Traffic, which also contains concepts addressing the question of the usage of the road or street by pedestrians for walking or crossing. Some countries like Ireland do not comply with the convention as rigorously as others. Laws and traditions vary from country to country.

Pedestrians account for 10% of fatalities: 217 pedestrian fatalities on EU motorways in 2012 and 847 between 2010 and 2012. The rate is 20% in Poland, 17% in Great Britain, 15% in Spain and 10% in France. These include vehicle users who leave their vehicles after they have broken down, workers in work zones and individuals who illegally enter the motorway on foot.

Belgium 
Pedestrians must use marked crossings within 20 m if the speed limit is above 30 km/h. However, any physical injury to a pedestrian caused by a traffic accident is compensated by the insurance of the drivers involved, regardless of the responsibility of the pedestrian, unless the pedestrian is over 14 and wanted the accident and its consequences to occur.

Finland
It is legal to cross all roads except motorways in Finland. Crossing a road must be done in a perpendicular direction, without undue delay, and must use a zebra crossing if one is nearby. Cars are required by law to give way to pedestrians at zebra crossings unless there is a traffic light.

France

 
Pedestrians are required to use sidewalks (if any), and zebra crossings for crossing a street if one is within 50 m; they must also
 cross at right angles to the road axis,
 only cross a place (including a market/town square in which motor vehicles are permitted) or any intersection on a formal crossing
 cross only at the green pedestrian light if in situ, and
 obey a police officer, if one regulates crossing.

More rules apply at night, on countryside roads, to groups of marching people, etc. Disregarding those rules may be punished by a fine of the lowest grade ("contravention de première classe": 11 to 17€, or 33€ if paid late) but few people were ever fined for such behaviour; any actual fines were usually because they showed contempt instead of apologising or providing some valid safety reason. On the other hand, drivers must always let pedestrians cross if they have already started or if they clearly demonstrate the intention to do so, even when the pedestrian is disregarding the rules, and will bear full responsibility if an accident occurs. These rules are often not respected; most pedestrians would cross anywhere (including at a red pedestrian light) when no car can be seen nearby on the road, but would not take the risk of trying to cross even on a zebra crossing when a car is coming, until it stops.

On French motorways, pedestrians are banned; in case of breakdown motorists are required to leave the car and walk away to safety, behind fences or lines marking the road boundaries, where no car can hit them. Nonetheless, some pedestrians are injured on motorways: in 2016, on the tolled motorway network:
 16% of fatalities were pedestrians, an average of 23 pedestrian fatalities per year on the network.
 69% of pedestrian motorway fatalities occurred on motorway lanes, 28% occurred on emergency lanes, and 3% in rest areas.
 injured pedestrians' presence on the motorway was due to breakdowns, stopping in emergency lanes (40%), accidents (28%), motorway staff (3%), providing assistance (2%), or other reasons (27%).

Germany 
Pedestrians must follow rules when crossing the street. Even so, Section 1 of the Road Traffic Regulation ( [StVO]), the most important section, requires the road user not to endanger anybody. Car drivers must always be prepared to brake for pedestrians, especially for children and elderly people. On the other hand, pedestrians, according to Section 25 § 25, Abs. 3, StVO (VwV), must watch the vehicular traffic carefully and cross a street quickly and using the shortest way across the driving lanes.

Depending on the situation on the street, pedestrians may not cross the street except at intersections or within the markings of traffic signals or crosswalks. Pedestrians who cross the street at intersections or crossings must use existing traffic signals or crosswalks. Cars and bikes are required by law to give way to pedestrians (but not bicycle riders) at zebra crossings unless there is a traffic light. If one wants to cross the street outside the markings of traffic lights or crosswalks, one must carefully observe before and during the crossing that the road is clear, and wait before crossing if a vehicle approaches. A pedestrian may not interrupt the flow of traffic.

Although 15m is not considered "at" the crosswalk or traffic light (KG Berlin VR 78 450), pedestrians may not cross the street 30 m (BGH VRS 26 327) near a crosswalk and 40 m (BGH NJW 00 3069: 39–43 m, KG Berlin VRS 89 98: 33.5m) near to a traffic light, but they do not need to go 200 m to a crossroad or 100 m to a traffic signal (OLG Hamburg VRS 87 249). During heavy traffic, pedestrians may not cross the street, as they might have to stop on a traffic lane (OLG Hamm, Az. 27 U 115/96). Typical fines for not using existing crosswalks or traffic lights in Germany are between €5 and €10.

Hungary 
Whilst jaywalking is not specifically defined by the Hungarian Highway Code (KRESZ) as an offence, various restrictions and prohibitions apply for pedestrians crossing or walking along roads. Fines are applied at the discretion of the police of up to 30,000 forint for each offence, according to Section 21 (1-13) of the code. Pedestrians have the right of way on crosswalks and may cross the road at certain specified points such as at intersections if crosswalks are not available.

Ireland 
Ireland maintains a jaywalking law, which requires a pedestrian to use a pedestrian crossing if they are within  of one. When crossing a road, pedestrians are advised to wait until it is safe to cross. Vehicles should give way to the pedestrian who uses a zebra crossing. Irish children are taught the Road Safety Authority safe cross code in schools where it teaches them to stop, listen, and look out for any incoming traffic whilst crossing a road and only cross a road if safe to do so. It also advises them to use traffic lights and zebra crossings to cross a road rather than jaywalk. The Garda Síochána usually do not take action on jaywalkers unless they caused possible harm to drivers or others.

Italy 
Pedestrians are allowed to cross a street without any recognised crossing point only if there are no zebra crossings within a range of 100 m, but they should be careful anyway. If pedestrians cross a street at a crosswalk, drivers must yield.
Walking on highways (autostrade) and main suburban roads (strade extraurbane principali) is always forbidden.

Netherlands
There is no concept of jaywalking in the Netherlands, so it is not an offence.

Poland
Jaywalking is an offence. One must cross only at recognised crossing points if there is one within 100 m (including pedestrian tunnels and footbridges). Otherwise, regular roads may be crossed with due care. Crossing dual carriageways (except motorways) is allowed only outside towns. Crossing tram and train tracks that are separate and parallel to street is always prohibited. Crossing on red lights is prohibited and considered to be an offence. According to regulations of "Prawo o Ruchu Drogowym" (Traffic Regulations Act) crossing the road outside the pedestrian crossing is allowed only if it does not endanger traffic safety or obstruct traffic. The pedestrian is not obliged to give priority to vehicles and should follow the shortest line to the opposite edge of the road, perpendicular to the road axis. Crossing the track separated from the road is only allowed in designated locations.

Portugal
It is illegal to cross the road except when the nearest zebra crossing is more than 50 m away. Any crossing above that distance is legal. Pedestrians have priority over cars but often ignore the rules.

Romania 
Jaywalking can be fined, but you are still permitted to cross the street on the corner of the street if no crosswalk exists but you don't have priority over the cars.

Scandinavia
It is legal to cross all roads except motorways in Denmark, Sweden and Norway. Cars and bikes are required by law to give way to pedestrians (but not bicycle riders) at zebra crossings unless there is a traffic light with a green light and it is green for the cars or bikes and no pedestrians are currently using the crossing. Pedestrians are encouraged to cross the road at zebra crossings if there is one nearby and are discouraged from crossing at a red light.

In Norway, a red man at the crossing is the signal for pedestrians not to begin crossing if it would impede cars or entail danger, but a person may walk across if there are no cars nearby. Risking oneself by running across in front of cars is not legal. Cyclists are required to stop at red lights, but because not everyone is aware of that, the Norwegian national cyclists' organisation has proposed to end confusion by prohibiting all people from crossing at red lights.

In Denmark, it is illegal to cross the road outside of a pedestrian crossing if one is nearby.

In Sweden, it is illegal, but not punishable, for a pedestrian to cross at a red light. However, if doing this causes a traffic accident, the pedestrian could be convicted of negligence in traffic.

Serbia
In Serbia, it is illegal to cross roads other than at pedestrian crossings if there is a zebra crossing within 100 m.

Slovakia
In Slovakia, it is illegal to cross roads other than at pedestrian crossings if there is a zebra crossing within , or for certain types of road. If not regulated by traffic lights, pedestrians have priority on pedestrian crossings over cars but not trams. However, pedestrians must wait for a safe moment to cross and so cars usually fail to stop if there are pedestrians around, unlike in other European countries where pedestrians may cross immediately.

Slovenia
In Slovenia, pedestrians are generally allowed to cross the street unless there is a zebra crossing within . As well as this, pedestrians also have priority at zebra crossings. However, pedestrians may not cross certain types of road.

Switzerland
In Switzerland, pedestrians are generally allowed to cross the street everywhere. They have priority on zebra crossings but should cross with care. However, they must use a pedestrian crossing, bridge or underpass if it is within 50 m. Certain types of roads must not be entered by pedestrians, such as highways and motorways. Failure to comply is subject to a fine of 20 Swiss Francs. Likewise, crossing or bypassing of closed railway gates is prohibited.

On motorways, fines may vary based on the situation. A driver driving at 100 km/h on a road with a 120 km/h speed limit, if the light visibility is 60 m and the braking distance is 65 m, may be fined for not noticing a person on the road. The fact that the person is suicidal does not matter. A fine of 210 Swiss francs fine is cheaper than the court costs. However, such circumstances may also be considered to be exceptional and unpredictable.

United Kingdom 

In England, Wales and Scotland (Great Britain) it is not illegal to cross or walk on all roads except motorways (where pedestrians and slow vehicles are not permitted), and roads with the "No Pedestrians" sign displayed. The Highway Code contains rules for crossing a road safely, but these are recommendations and not legally directly enforceable, though branches of the highway code may be used as supporting evidence in prosecutions. Under section 3 Road Traffic Act 1988 (“RTA 1988”) it is an offence to drive a motor vehicle on a road or public place “without due care and attention, or without reasonable consideration for other persons using the road or place”.  As with other advisory parts of the Highway Code compliance and non-compliance can be used to claim/counterclaim/defend against liability in civil law claims such as insurance claims.

The term "jaywalking" is obscure. There is no law preventing such an act. Culturally, "jaywalking" often confuses British citizens abroad and visitors to the UK. British citizens, like citizens from other countries where it is not an offence, are more prone to infringe jaywalking laws abroad. Transport for London identified tourists visiting London as being particularly vulnerable due to the personal assessment of risk expected of all pedestrians who cross roads. Some tourists copy locals' most risky crossing stunts, falsely assuming there was no advanced risk assessment involved or a higher right-of-way to vehicles, without understanding they have less right-of-way in all but a few places and times. A third reason is that many visitors are not used to all traffic driving on the left. Recent changes to the Highway code have given priority to pedestrians waiting to cross a road.

A 2014 Yougov poll found 77% of Britons believed walking on roads when it is safe to do so should remain legal; 14% favoured making it illegal. A similar US Yougov poll found 30% believed "jaywalking" should be legal - in most settlements, there is next to no centuries-old societal norm of specific roads on which it may in daytime be safe to walk, such as horse-frequented, cobbled or hump-calmed rural village.

When crossing, pedestrians are expected to use their judgement and wait until it is safe to cross. Under Rule 170 of the Highway Code, if a pedestrian has already started crossing the road (from either side) across a side street into which a car is about to turn, vehicles should always give way and let them leave the road safely. In UK schools children are taught to cross roads safely through the Green Cross Code. British children are taught to "Stop, Look and Listen" before crossing a road, as demonstrated in the Think! campaign.

Unlike the rest of the UK, in Northern Ireland jaywalking is an offence. This is through article 38 of the Road Traffic (Northern Ireland) Order 1995, which states "If a pedestrian through his own negligence on a road endangers his own safety, or that of any other person, he is guilty of an offence."In both 2005 and 2006, hundreds of fines were issued for jaywalking, however from 2018 onways this had reduced to approximately 50 per year.

North America

Canada

Jaywalking is not in the Criminal Code and is not considered a criminal offence in Canada. No law on jaywalking exists at the federal level, although several provinces and territories in Canada, as well as municipalities, have enacted regulations and/or by-laws that restrict when a pedestrian may cross a roadway. Most of these provincial regulations and municipal by-laws do not use the term jaywalking to describe when a pedestrian unlawfully crosses a roadway.

Section 144 of Ontario's Highway Traffic Act stipulates pedestrians are required to use a marked crosswalk to cross the roadway when they are near one; although the same section also allows pedestrians to cross a roadway when they are not adjacent to a marked crosswalk and they yield to on-coming traffic. Similar traffic regulations also exist in Quebec's highway safety code, and Saskatchewan's Traffic Safety Act.

As a result of differing provincial/territorial regulations and/or municipal by-laws, the fine that is charged for crossing a motorway varies across the country, from C$30 in Quebec, to C$697.50 in Nova Scotia. In Ontario, motorway crossing related fines are typically charged under section 144 of the Highway Traffic Act, or a municipal by-law, with an average fine of C$35; although the maximum fine a pedestrian can be charged under the Ontario's Highway Traffic Act is C$50. Although provincial regulations and municipal by-laws on crossing a motorway exist, its enforcement remains extremely rare.

Mexico
Jaywalking is not illegal in Mexico. However, on the Paseo de la Reforma, one of Mexico City's longest and most important avenues, Andrés Manuel López Obrador, then the city's mayor, commissioned the installation of concrete prisms along the avenue's central kerb, to discourage pedestrians from crossing the road.

United States 
State road rules in the United States usually require a driver to yield the right of way to a pedestrian crossing a road when the pedestrian crosses at a marked crosswalk or an unmarked crosswalk. Unmarked crosswalks generally exist as the logical extensions of sidewalks at intersections with approximately right angles. Following the Uniform Vehicle Code, state codes often do not prohibit a pedestrian from crossing a roadway between intersections if at least one of the two adjacent intersections is not controlled by a signal, but they stipulate that a pedestrian not at a crosswalk must yield the right of way to approaching drivers. State codes often permit pedestrians to use roads that are not controlled access facilities and without sidewalks but such use is usually regulated. For example, in Florida they must keep to the shoulder of the leftmost side of the road and yield to any oncoming traffic.

State codes may include provisions that allow local authorities to prohibit pedestrian crossing at locations outside crosswalks, but since municipal pedestrian ordinances are often not well known to drivers or pedestrians and can vary from place to place in a metropolitan area that contains many municipalities, obtaining compliance with local prohibitions of pedestrian crossings much more restrictive than statewide pedestrian regulations can be difficult. Signs, fences, and barriers of various types (including planted hedges) have been used to prohibit and prevent pedestrian crossing at some locations. If the detour to a legal crossing would be highly inconvenient, even fences are sometimes not effective. Street design, traffic design, and locations of major building entrances that make crosswalks the most logical and practical locations to cross streets are usually more effective than police enforcement to reduce illegal or reckless pedestrian crossings.

At a signaled crossing, a pedestrian is subject to the applicable pedestrian traffic signal or, if no pedestrian signal is displayed, the signal indications for the parallel vehicular movement. A pedestrian signal permits a pedestrian to begin crossing a street during the "Walk" display; pedestrians are usually considered to be "jaywalking" only if they enter the crosswalk some other time. The meanings of pedestrian signal indications are summarised in Section 4E.02 of the national Manual on Uniform Traffic Control Devices.

Jaywalking is considered an infraction, but in some jurisdictions, it is a misdemeanor or requires a court appearance. The penalty is usually a fine. In some cities, such as New York City, Chicago, Los Angeles, and Boston, although prohibited, "jaywalking" has been so common that police generally cite or detain jaywalkers only if their behavior is considered excessively dangerous or disruptive, such as running out in front of a moving vehicle or crossing after the light is about to change to allow cross traffic to proceed. Penalties for jaywalking vary by state, and, within a state, may vary by county or municipality. A sampling of US cities found fines ranging from $1 to $1,000.

On 30 September 2022, California governor Gavin Newsom signed a bill decriminalizing jaywalking in the state of California. The bill, AB-2147, known as The Freedom to Walk Act, was initially introduced by Assemblymember Phil Ting (D-CA). It bars law enforcement from stopping and citing a pedestrian for "safe mid-block crossings" except in the circumstances where "a reasonably careful person would realize there is an immediate danger of a collision".

In May 2017, a Boston Globe reporter spent the day attempting to get a $1 citation for jaywalking in downtown traffic. The reporter walked against lights, crossed in the middle of streets, and across the middle of blocks and did not receive a ticket, even when committing infractions in front of police officers.

Jaywalking at a signalised intersection may carry higher fines in some jurisdictions for disobeying the signalised controls. Many jurisdictions have a separate law defining the difference between jaywalking, or "disobedience of traffic signal controls." Some jurisdictions may fine pedestrians up to the same amount as a vehicle running a red light, but no driving points are issued, as the pedestrian was not driving at the time.

Safety considerations
In the United States, jaywalking is linked to pedestrian injuries and fatalities,
but no available data provide an exact risk rate because of missing jaywalking frequency data.

In the United States, jaywalking is mainly an urban issue (71%), but it can also be a suburban or rural issue when no pavement is available.

In the United States, jaywalking might be understood as:
    walking against a pedestrian walk signal,
    crossing a street where there is no crosswalk (midblock crossing),
    crossing a street outside of a marked crosswalk where one is present, and
    walking on a street along with the traffic flow (ignoring designated pedestrian pathways).

However other pedestrian behaviour might be considered as unsafe while not qualified of jaywalking, for instance, failing to yield (both drivers and pedestrians), jogging/walking in the wrong direction, working on a parked car, leaning on a parked car, pushing a disabled car, standing between parked cars, and standing in a road.

Some pedestrian factors that lead to a jaywalking behavior were found to be pedestrian perceptions of risk, consumption of alcohol, perceptions of crossing devices, speed and pace of life, speed versus crossing-device speed, perceptions of enforcement risk, unawareness of pedestrian laws and safety, following the leader.

Some known environmental factors include absence of midblock crosswalks, width of roads, poor timing of crossing signals, poor conditions of sidewalks, absence of sidewalks in certain areas, capacity of sidewalks, weather, people with limited mobility, people with occupational risks, children and teens, parking areas near shopping centers, street repair and construction sites, major highways, one-way streets, location of attractions, and unlawful street-vending.

Racial bias

In California, differences by race in charging of pedestrians for jaywalking has led to assertions of racial bias and proposals to end considering jaywalking to be an offense.

California Assembly member Phil Ting proposed decriminalizing jaywalking. The bill, AB 2147, The Freedom To Walk Act, passed by the legislature and signed by Governor Gavin Newsom, took effect on January 1, 2023.

Seattle City Council members Bruce Harrell and Lorena González raised issues of bias in jaywalking tickets in that city as well.

Oceania

Australia 
In Australia, it is illegal to start crossing the road at an intersection if a pedestrian light is red or flashing red. If no such pedestrian light exists, the traffic lights are used, making it illegal to proceed on red or orange. Furthermore, it is illegal to cross any road within 20 m of an intersection with pedestrian lights or within 20 m of any pedestrian crossing (including a zebra crossing, school crossing, or any other pedestrian crossing).

However, laws against jaywalking are rarely enforced, with the exception of the occasional police "blitz" on jaywalking for a week or so at a time, when the laws are enforced more stringently. Some roads with a record of pedestrian accidents feature fences in the centre to discourage pedestrians, but there is no law against crossing them. States set their own fines for jaywalking. The fine is $50 in Western Australia.

New Zealand 
Pedestrians in New Zealand must, if possible, cross at right angles to the kerb or side of the roadway unless they use pedestrian crossings or school crossing points. Pedestrians must use a pedestrian crossing, footbridge, underpass or traffic signal within 20 m. At intersections controlled by signals, pedestrians should wait for the green man to display and may not begin crossing when the static or the flashing red man is displayed. The fine for jaywalking is up to $35.

South America

Brazil 
In Brazil, it is illegal to cross the road if the nearest zebra crossing is within 50 m. Pedestrians have priority over cars. According to CONTRAN resolution 706/17 from April 25, 2018, violators could pay a fine up to 44.19 Brazilian reals; however, the measure is rarely enforced.

See also
 Red flag traffic laws
 Automotive city
 Effects of the car on societies
 Green transport hierarchy
 Misdemeanor
 Pedestrian crossing
 Pedestrian village
 Reclaim the Streets
 Shared space
 Walkability

References

Further reading

External links

 What every Brit should know about jaywalking; BBC News
 

Road transport
Pedestrian safety
Walking
Car crime